Lues Waya (born 1 August 2001) is a New Caledonian footballer currently playing for AS Tiga Sport of the New Caledonia Super Ligue, and the New Caledonia national team.

Club career 
Waya began playing football in the academy of AS Tiga Sport at age 12. A few years later he moved to AS Wetr for two seasons before returning to Tiga Sport. He began as a goalkeeper before transitioning to midfielder and eventually striker.

He was promoted to Tiga's first team in 2019 and became a key player during the 2020 season. Between March and December that year, he score five total goals, three in the regular season and an additional two goals in the play-offs. He also tallied at least one assist and drew two penalty kicks over that time. In the league final, Waya scored as Tiga Sport defeated AS Magenta 2–0 to win the club's first-ever Super League title.

Waya began the 2022 season with a hattrick against AS Qanono to remain at the top of the table. AS Tiga Sport won the league title again that season, with Waya scoring on the final matchday to secure the result. He was the league's top scorer that season with twenty four goals. He was later named the league's best player for the season.

In December 2022, following the 2022 domestic season, it was announced that Waya was traveling to Metropolitan France to join Voltigeurs de Châteaubriant of the Championnat National 2, the fourth tier league in the country, at the midpoint of the league's 2022–2023 season. He also received interest from Stade Bordelais and a club from Bastia. However, several days later it was announced that the player had accepted an invitation to trial with FC Nantes of Ligue 1 from 2-15 January 2023. Waya made his debut for the club with the reserve team on 6 January 2023 in a friendly defeat to US Concarneau. Shortly thereafter it was announced that the trial had been extended by a few weeks.

Following the three-week trial in Nantes, Waya went on to join Stade Lavallois of Ligue 2 for an additional trial in early February 2023. At the end of the trial he was signed to the club’s reserve squad in the Championnat National 3 until the end of the season.

International career 
At the youth level, Waya represented New Caledonia at the 2019 OFC Youth Development Tournament. In New Caledonia's final match of the group stage, from the penalty spot Waya scored his team's only goal in a 1–4 defeat to guest team India.

Waya was called up to the senior national team for the first time in March 2022 for 2022 FIFA World Cup qualification. He went on to make his debut on 24 March as a second-half substitute in a defeat to New Zealand.

International career statistics
As of match played 24 March 2022

References

External links
National Football Teams profile
Soccerway profile

2001 births
Living people
New Caledonian footballers
New Caledonia international footballers
Association football forwards